The Soyombo symbol (from ) is a special character in the Soyombo alphabet invented by Zanabazar in 1686. The name "Soyombo" is derived from Sanskrit svayambhu "self-created". It serves as a national symbol of Mongolia, to be found on the Flag of Mongolia, the Emblem of Mongolia, and on many other official documents.

In the Soyombo alphabet, the two variations of the Soyombo symbol are used to mark the start and end of a text. It is thought to be possible that the symbol itself may predate the script.

Symbolism
The Soyombo has ten elements in the columnar arrangement of abstract and geometric symbols and patterns.  They are fire, sun, crescent moon, two triangles, two horizontal rectangles, the Taijitu (yin and yang) and two vertical rectangles. The elements in the symbol are given the following significance (from top):
 Fire is a general symbol of eternal growth, wealth, and success. The three tongues of the flame represent the past, present, and future.
 Sun (●) and moon symbolizes the existence of the Mongolian nation for eternity as the eternal blue sky. Mongolian symbol of the sun, crescent moon and fire derived from the Xiongnu.
 The two triangles (▼) allude to the point of an arrow or spear. They point downward to announce the defeat of interior and exterior enemies.
 The two horizontal rectangles (▬) give stability to the round shape. The rectangular shape represents the honesty and justice of the people of Mongolia, whether they stand at the top or at the bottom of society.
 The Taijitu symbol (☯) illustrates the mutual complement of man and woman. It is interpreted as two fishes, symbolizing vigilance, because fish never close their eyes.
 The two vertical rectangles (▮) can be interpreted as the walls of a fort. They represent unity and strength, relating to a Mongolian proverb: "The friendship of two is stronger than stone walls."

Uses 

The Soyombo symbol has appeared on the national Flag of Mongolia since its independence in 1911 (except between 1940-1945). It served as the Emblem of Mongolia from 1911 to 1940, and was included in the design again in 1992. Mongolian Armed Forces vehicles bear the symbol as a marking.

The symbol is seen all over the country, especially on a hillside outside of Ulaanbaatar.

The flag and coat of arms of Buryatia as well as the flag of Agin-Buryat Okrug in Russia, and that of the Inner Mongolian People's Party display the top elements (Flame, Sun, and Moon).

Unicode 
There are alternative forms of the Soyombo at U+11A9F, 𑪟, Soyombo Head Mark With Moon And Sun And Flame and U+11AA0, 𑪠, Soyombo Head Mark With Moon And Sun. The Soyombo block was added to Unicode in June 2017 with version 10.0.

Flags incorporating Soyombo variants

See also 
 National anthem of Mongolia

References

National symbols of Mongolia
Mongolian writing systems